Yasumichi is a masculine Japanese given name.

Possible writings
Yasumichi can be written using different combinations of kanji characters. Here are some examples:

靖道, "peaceful, way"
靖路, "peaceful, route"
靖通, "peaceful, pass through"
康道, "healthy, way"
康路, "healthy, route"
康通, "healthy, pass through"
安道, "tranquil, way"
安通, "tranquil, pass through"
保道, "preserve, way"
保路, "preserve, route"
保通, "preserve, pass through"
泰道, "peaceful, way"
泰路, "peaceful, route"
易道, "divination, way"

The name can also be written in hiragana やすみち or katakana ヤスミチ.

Notable people with the name
, Japanese voice actor
, Japanese interior designer 
, Japanese kugyō
 Yasumichi Sugiyama (杉山 泰道, 1889–1936), pen name: Kyusaku Yumeno (夢野 久作), Japanese author
, Japanese footballer

Japanese masculine given names